Frndly TV is an American streaming television service that offers live TV, on demand video and cloud-based DVR for over 40 live television networks. Frndly TV curates a channel lineup with a focus on being family-friendly, and includes U.S. networks Hallmark Channel, The Weather Channel, Curiosity Channel, A&E, History, Lifetime, MeTV, Story Television, and Up TV.

History 
Started by Bassil El-Khatib, who worked 12 years at Dish Network & Sling TV, and other former Dish executives who felt many of the streaming bundles were getting too big. In October 2019, Frndly TV launched with 12 live TV channels and cloud DVR storage, with channels that included Hallmark Channel, The Weather Channel, and Outdoor Channel. In December 2019, TechHive awarded Frndly TV runner-up for the best new service of 2019.

In March 2020, Frndly TV added Curiosity Channel and INSP, bringing the live TV channel count to 15.

In 2021, Frndly TV added several channels with the addition of Dove Channel (March 2021), via a deal with Cinedigm Networks as well as BYU TV (April 2021). In June 2021, Frndly TV added two new channels owned by Allen Media Group, Recipe.TV and Local Now. In July 2021, Frndly TV added getTV in a distribution agreement with Sony Pictures Television. FETV (Family Entertainment Television) was also added the same month. In August 2021, Circle network was added. Hallmark Movies Now was made available in October 2021 as Frndly's first add on option to the service. Frndly TV and GAC Media reached an agreement to add GAC Media channels, GAC Living and GAC Family, to the service in October 2021. Frndly TV and A&E Networks reached a deal to add A&E’s portfolio of channels such as A&E, History, and Lifetime to the streaming service on November 18, 2021. With the addition, the price of the service went up for the first time.

Further additions were made in 2022, including the Family Movie Classics (FMC) channel being added to the service in January 2022. In March 2022, Frndly TV announced a multi-year agreement with Weigel Broadcasting to bring five national TV networks to its lineup: MeTV, Heroes & Icons, Decades, Story Television, and Start TV. This made Frndly TV the first live TV streaming service to carry all five of the networks. In June 2022, Frndly TV announced the addition of 3 new channels: Movies!, Dove Movies, and Crime & Investigation.  This bringing the live TV channel count to over 40 channels; however, Weigel Broadcasting's Movies! would not be added to the service until the following year. In December 2022, Frndly TV began adding more on-demand tv shows and movies from A&E networks at no additional charge. 

In January 2023, Frndly TV added the Cowboy Way Channel. The following February, Frndly TV added Ion Television, Grit and Ion Mystery networks with an agreement with the E. W. Scripps Company. After a long delay, Movies! was added to the service on February 3, 2023.

Supported devices 
Frndly TV's service can be streamed via a number of platforms. This includes Android and Apple iOS devices including iPhone & iPad and Android phones. In addition, the service is available via Roku, Apple TV, Amazon Fire TV, Android TV (Google TV), Chromecast and multiple web browsers.

References

External links 
frndlytv.com

Internet properties established in 2019
2019 establishments in Colorado
Internet television streaming services